is a Japanese voice actress and singer from Ube, Yamaguchi.

Career 
She was scouted as a singer and began singing in the TWOFIVE production company. After that, she joined the talent agency Production Baobab to work as a voice actress.

After transferring to Baobab, she mainly worked as a voice actress for dubbing, games, and Disney-related work, but began auditioning for animation around 2009, being her first leading role Mizuki Himeji in the anime series Baka and Test.

It was announced on her official blog that she stopped working for Production Baobab on September 10, 2016.

On January 6, 2020, Harada announced that she had joined Kikuko Inoue’s own agency, Office Anemone.

Filmography

Anime 
2007
 Kimikiss Pure Rouge as Manami Hiba

2008
 Bleach as Menoly Mallia

2009
 Sasameki Koto as Tomoe Hachisuka

2010
 Amagami SS as Manaka Hiba, Mika Makihara
 Baka to Test to Shōkanjū as Mizuki Himeji
 Hidamari Sketch as Nori
 Hidamari Sketch (special) as Nori
 Scan2Go as Titi

2011
 Baka to Test to Shōkanjū: Ni! as Mizuki Himeji
 Bakugan Battle Brawlers: Gundalian Invaders as Boy, Taylor
 Hidamari Sketch × SP as Nori
 Maken-ki! as Aki Nijou

2012
 Amagami SS+ plus as Manaka Hiba
 Another as Kirika
 Hidamari Sketch × Honeycomb as Nori
 High School DxD as Caramine

2013
 Muromi-san as Fuji-san
 Senran Kagura as Asuka
 Unbreakable Machine-Doll as Yaya

2014
 Girl Friend Beta as Erena Mochizuki
 Inugami-san to Nekoyama-san as Tamaki Nekoyama
 Lord Marksman and Vanadis as Valentina Glinka Estes
 Maken-Ki! Two as Aki Nijou

2015
 The Idolmaster Cinderella Girls as Airi Totoki
 The Idolmaster Cinderella Girls 2nd Season as Airi Totoki
 Valkyrie Drive as Momoka Sagara

2016
 Big Order as Kagekiyo Tairano

2017
 Battle Girl High School as Kokomi Asahina

2018
 Sword Gai as Kiyomi

2022
 Bleach: Thousand-Year Blood War as Menoly Mallia
 Miss Kuroitsu from the Monster Development Department as Elbakki

OVA 
 Baka to Test to Shōkanjū: Matsuri as Mizuki Himeji
 Touhou Project Side Story: Memory of Star as Reisen Udongein Inaba, Marisa Kirisame

Movies 
 The Disappearance of Haruhi Suzumiya as Kotone Kenmochi

Games 
 Baka to Test to Shōkanjū: Portable as Mizuki Himeji
 Cambrian QTS
 Dream Club as Rui
 Elsword as Ruriel
 Futaba Riho
 Hoshi no Ōjo 2
 Hyperdimension Neptunia – MarvelousAQL
 KimiKiss
 Otomedius Excellent as Kokoro Belmont
 Senran Kagura – Asuka
 Senran Kagura Burst – Asuka
 Senran Kagura Shinovi Versus – Asuka
 Senran Kagura 2: Deep Crimson – Asuka
 Senran Kagura: Estival Versus  Asuka
 Senran Kagura: Peach Beach Splash – Asuka
 Super Bomberman R – Karaoke Bomber
 The Idolmaster Cinderella Girls as Airi Totoki
 Yo-Jin-Bo
 Zoids Infinity EX NEO
 Zoids Generations

Discography 
 Little Explorer (contained theme song to  Eden* They Were Only Two, On The Planet)
 Eternal Feather (contained theme song to Ef: A Fairy Tale of the Two.- The First Tale)
 Emotional Flutter (contained theme song to Ef: A Fairy Tale of the Two. – The Latter Tale)
 Ever Forever (contained theme song to Ef: A Fairy Tale of the Two.)
 Haru no Uta (contained theme song to Haru no Ashioto)
 Natsu Natsu Soundtrack (contained theme song to Natsu ☆ Natsu)
 Once (contained theme song to Itsuka Tenma no Kuro Usagi )
 Magenta Another Sky (contained theme song to La storia della Arcana Famiglia)
 Shissouron (contained theme song to Senran Kagura)
 Kyoumei no True Force (contained theme song to Seirei Tsukai no Blade Dance)
 Schwarzer Bogen (contained theme song to Madan no Ou to Vanadis)

References

External links 

 Official website 
 Official agency profile 
 

Living people
Anime singers
Japanese women pop singers
Japanese video game actresses
Japanese voice actresses
Musicians from Yamaguchi Prefecture
Production Baobab voice actors
Video game musicians
Voice actresses from Yamaguchi Prefecture
Year of birth missing (living people)
21st-century Japanese actresses
21st-century Japanese women singers
21st-century Japanese singers